The Mirna Bridge is located between the Nova Vas and Višnjan interchanges of the A9 motorway in Istria, Croatia, spanning the Mirna River and the wide Mirna River valley. The bridge has been open for traffic since June 2005. The bridge is one of the most significant structures on the motorway. The bridge was designed by Zlatko Šavor.

The A9 route between Umag and Kanfanar, where the Mirna Bridge is located, was upgraded to motorway standards in June 2011. However, the works did not include construction of a parallel structure across the Mirna River which would carry the additional carriageway. Expansion of the bridge to a full motorway is planned to start in 2013 and be completed by 2015.

Mirna is the longest river in Istria with a length of more than 50 km. Its value for this area has been undisputable throughout the ages: from mills, to transport and trading as well as sports activities. Today, Mirna River flows peacefully through an artificially made riverbed, while surrounded by stunning scenery, pastures, forests, hills and picturesque hilltop towns.

The river's spring is located in a small village called Kotli. Mirna river flows through the village of Kotli forming waterfalls and hollowing cauldron-like forms in stone that gave the village its name (Croatian kotao-cauldron).

When you are in Kotli area then visiting Hum, the smallest town in the world, is a must. Legends say that Mirna valley was first inhabited by giants. Each giant settled on his own hill and used large stone blocks to build the towns in the valley. After they built all the larger towns and villages, the giants used the remaining stones and built together the hilltop village of Hum. Even today, Hum is a cultural, historical and a gastronomical center, mostly known for its Glagolitic wall writings - one of the oldest examples of Croatian Glagolitic literary culture in the Middle Ages.

Description
The deck structure stretches across 22 spans:  + 15 x   +   + 2 x   +   +   + . 
The design of the bridge was initially in  spans, but the final layout was imposed by the particular soil conditions and the arrangement of the river bed and canals below the bridge. Since the soil supporting the bridge foundations has exceptionally low load carrying capacity, it was important to reduce weight of the structure as much as possible. Therefore, the design employs two weight-reducing elements: longitudinal steel girders and piers with cap beams at varying heights. The latter reduces volume of concrete used for construction of the piers thereby reducing weight of the structure while giving the bridge a curved, concave deck.

The design of the pier foundations was further affected by the fact that the valley is a high quality agricultural area that had to be preserved as much as possible. The piers comprise an I-cross section with the webs aligned with the bridge axis. Peripheral piers (P1, P2, P20, P21) are executed on shallow foundations, while the remaining piers are executed on driven piles. The cross section of the superstructure consists of two solid I-section steel girders of constant depth.

Traffic volume
Traffic is regularly counted and reported by BINA Istra, the operator of the bridge and the A9 motorway where the bridge is located, and published by Hrvatske ceste. Substantial variations between annual (AADT) and summer (ASDT) traffic volumes are attributed to the fact that the bridge carries much tourist traffic to the Istrian Adriatic resorts. The traffic count is performed using analysis of motorway toll ticket sales.

See also
List of bridges by length
A9 motorway

References

External links
 

Plate girder bridges
Bridges completed in 2005
Toll bridges in Croatia
Buildings and structures in Istria County